Anders Walter Lidén  (March 10, 1887 – January 13, 1969) was a Swedish football player who competed in the 1908 Summer Olympics. In the 1908 tournament, he was a part of the Swedish football team that finished in 4th place.

References

External links

1887 births
1969 deaths
Swedish footballers
Sweden international footballers
Olympic footballers of Sweden
Footballers at the 1908 Summer Olympics
Association football midfielders
IFK Göteborg players